Thackara is a surname. Notable people with the surname include:

Alexander Montgomery Thackara (1848–1937), American diplomat
Anthony Thackara (1917–2007), British cricketer
Eleanor Sherman Thackara (1859-1915), American philanthropist
James Thackara (born 1944), American-British writer 
John Thackara (born 1951), British writer, advisor and public speaker